Paul Sieber (born 12 February 1993) is an Austrian rower. He competed in the men's lightweight double sculls event at the 2016 Summer Olympics.

References

External links
 

1993 births
Living people
Austrian male rowers
Olympic rowers of Austria
Rowers at the 2016 Summer Olympics
Place of birth missing (living people)
Rowers at the 2010 Summer Youth Olympics